The Circa Reproductions Nieuports are a family of Canadian 7/8 scale World War I sesquiplane aircraft replicas designed by Graham Lee of Lamont, Alberta for amateur construction from plans sold by Lee's company Circa Reproductions. Leading Edge Air Foils of Peyton, Colorado at one time also made construction kits available. Lee's Nieuports were among the earliest First World War replicas available and paved the way for later companies to produce plans and kits for a great variety of warbirds.

The aircraft's design was attributed to "the result of many years of affection for WWI type aircraft and a "too limited" flying budget."

Design and development
The Nieuport 11 was the first design in the family and is a 7/8 (87%) scale version of the original French Nieuport 11 Bebe fighter. The prototype, registered as a Canadian basic ultralight as C-IRCA, first flew in July 1984.

The Nieuport 11 is constructed from 6061-T6 aluminum tubing, supported with 2024-T3 aluminum gussets, held together with blind rivets. At one point welded steel tube fuselages were also available. The wings, tail and fuselage are then covered with doped aircraft fabric. Landing gear is conventional, with  spoked mainwheels with bungee suspension. The original design calls for a tailskid, the same as the World War One original aircraft, but since the skid is impractical on hard surfaced runways, a tailwheel is optional. The engine cowling is a horseshoe shaped semi-circular design.

Recommended engines for the aircraft include the  Rotax 447, the  Rotax 503, Volkswagen air-cooled engines and various Hirth engines. The designer estimated that the Nieuport 11 would take 400 hours to construct.

The aircraft have been described as being "very easy to fly, even by novice pilots."

By 2015 over 1200 sets of plans had been sold.

Operational history
The Nieuport 11 won Grand Champion Light Plane at Oshkosh in 1989 and the Nieuport 12 won Reserve Grand Champion at Oshkosh in 1990.

Variants
Nieuport 11
Single seat 7/8 scale reproduction of the Nieuport 11 fighter of 1916. First flown in July 1984. Kits were available in ultralight and experimental versions to meet United States FAR 103 Ultralight Vehicles and Experimental amateur-built regulations respectively. The ultralight version uses lighter tubing, engine and wheels to save weight.
Nieuport 12
Two seat 7/8 scale reproduction of the Nieuport 12 WWI observation aircraft, first flown in 1989. The designer estimates construction time at 1400 hours. Aircraft has  gross weight. Recommended engines include the  Rotax 582,  Continental A65,  Lycoming O-145 or  Volkswagen air-cooled engine.
Nieuport 17
Single seat 7/8 scale reproduction of the Nieuport 17 WWI fighter aircraft. This variant is similar to the Nieuport 11, but with a  greater wingspan and a completely circular engine cowling. The designer estimates construction time at 400 hours.

Specifications (Nieuport 11 Bebe)

See also
Airdrome Nieuport 11
Airdrome Nieuport 17

References

External links

Homebuilt aircraft
Sesquiplanes
Leading Edge Air Foils aircraft